Huang Hsiao-ying (born 3 July 1974) is a Taiwanese taekwondo practitioner. She competed at the 1993 World Taekwondo Championships, where she was defeated by eventual world champion Jung Myoung-sook in the 8th-final. She won a bronze medal in heavyweight at the 1995 World Taekwondo Championships in Manila, after being defeated by Jung Myoung-sook in the semifinal.

References

External links

1974 births 
Living people
Taiwanese female taekwondo practitioners
World Taekwondo Championships medalists
20th-century Taiwanese women